Neusticosaurus (sometimes misspelled Neuticosaurus) ("swimming lizard"), is an extinct genus of marine reptile belonging to the pachypleurosaurs, from Italy, Switzerland and Germany. Neusticosaurus was one of the smallest nothosaurs and probably fed on small fish.

References

Seeley, H.G. (1882). Quarterly Journal of the Geological Society of  London 38:350–366.

Nothosaurs
Triassic sauropterygians
Middle Triassic reptiles of Europe
Taxa named by Harry Seeley
Fossil taxa described in 1882
Sauropterygian genera